Kikuyu Constituency is an electoral constituency in Kenya. It is one of twelve constituencies in Kiambu County. The constituency was established for the 1963 elections. From 1988 elections to 2002 elections it was known as Kabete Constituency. With the new demarcation of constituencies by the Independent Electoral and Boundaries Commission (IEBC), the constituency was split into two and now we have Kikuyu Constituency and Kabete Constituency. The Current Member of Parliament for Kikuyu Constituency is Hon. Anthony Kimani Ichung'wa who was elected on The National Alliance Party (TNA) ticket. He is also the Vice - Chairman of the Public Investments Committee, Member of the committee of Powers and Privileges and equally a Member of the Departmental Committee on Agriculture, Livestock and Co-operatives in parliament. Kikuyu Constituency borders Kabete, Limuru, Westlands and Dagoreti Constituencies. The constituency had its name changed to Kabete Constituency before 2007 General Elections and Later in 2012 during the review of boundaries by the Independent Electoral Boundaries Commission (IEBC), the constituency was split into two, thereby creating Kikuyu and Kabete constituencies Respectively.

Kikuyu Constituency has registered rapid growth in the recent past due to the demand for housing which the construction sector is rapidly trying to match. More and more housing units are being put up especially on plots with close proximity with the road. The area provides a conducive area for habitation and due to the elaborate infrastructure and proximity to Nairobi where most individuals work. The region has a mixture of urban and semi-urban lifestyle which makes it possible for people to access food easily from surrounding farmers as well as access other social amenities with ease.

Other constituencies within Kiambu county are; Limuru, Lari, Gatundu North, Gatundu South, Juja, Thika Town, Ruiru Githunguri, Kiambu and Kiambaa.

Members of Parliament

Wards

References 

Constituencies in Kiambu County
Constituencies in Central Province (Kenya)
1963 establishments in Kenya
Constituencies established in 1963